Maureen Gruben is a Canadian Inuvialuk artist who works in sculpture, installation and public art.

Biography
Gruben was born in Tuktoyaktuk. She received a Diploma in Fine Arts from Okanagan College, Kelowna in 1990. In 2012 she received a Bachelor of Fine Arts degree from the University of Victoria. In May 2021 it was announced that Gruben was on the long list for the annual Sobey Art Award, one of five artists from the "Prairies and North". In 2021 the National Gallery of Canada lifted its "40-and-under" age restriction allowing for the inclusion of Gruben and other artists.

Exhibitions
2020 Àbadakone, National Gallery of Canada.
2019 Transit and Returns, Vancouver Art Gallery
2019 Breathing Hole, Winnipeg Art Gallery
2019 AIVIQ &NANUQ: Sea Horse and Sea Bear of the Arctic, Anchorage Museum
2019 yəhaw̓, Seattle Office of Arts & Culture ARTS Gallery
2018 QULLIQ: In Darkness, Light,  Libby Leshgold Gallery, Emily Carr University of Art and Design, Vancouver
2018 The Time of Things, Legacy Art Galleries, University of Victoria.
2017 Grunt Gallery, Vancouver
2017 A Sense of Site, Art Gallery of Nova Scotia
2017 Stitching my Landscape, Pingo National Landmark
2015 Custom Made, Kamloops Art Gallery

References

Living people
Year of birth missing (living people)
20th-century Canadian women artists
21st-century Canadian women artists
Inuit artists
University of Victoria alumni
Artists from the Northwest Territories